Anicius Auchenius Bassus (fl. 408) was a politician of the Roman Empire. 
In 408 he was appointed consul. According to B.L. Twyman, he represents the "mainline" of the gens Anicia.

Bassus was probably the son of the Anicius Auchenius Bassus who was praefectus urbi in 382-383 and of Turrenia Honorata. He had a son, also called Anicius Auchenius Bassus, consul in 431. He wrote the epigraph for the tomb of Monica, Augustine of Hippo's mother. The actual stone on which it was written was rediscovered in 1945 in the church of Santa Aurea, in Ostia Antica.

Notes

Bibliography 
 John Robert Martindale, Arnold Hugh Martin Jones, John Morris, "Anicius Auchenius Bassus 7", The Prosopography of the Later Roman Empire, Volume 2, Cambridge University Press, 1992, pp. 219–220.

5th-century Romans
5th-century Roman consuls
Auchenius Bassus (408)
Imperial Roman consuls